Warren Ward may refer to:

 Warren Ward (basketball) (born 1989), Canadian basketball player
 Warren Ward (footballer) (born 1962), English footballer